Finland participated in the Eurovision Song Contest 2011 with the song "Da Da Dam" written by Axel Ehnström. The song was performed by Paradise Oskar, which is the artistic name of singer Axel Ehnström. The Finnish broadcaster Yleisradio (Yle) organised the national final Euroviisut 2011 in order to select the Finnish entry for the 2011 contest in Düsseldorf, Germany. 15 entries were selected to compete in the national final, which consisted of three semi-finals and a final, taking place in January and February 2011. Ten entries ultimately competed in the final on 12 February where votes from the public selected "Da Da Dam" performed by Paradise Oskar as the winner.

Finland was drawn to compete in the first semi-final of the Eurovision Song Contest which took place on 10 May 2011. Performing during the show in position 10, "Da Da Dam" was announced among the top 10 entries of the first semi-final and therefore qualified to compete in the final on 14 May. It was later revealed that Finland placed third out of the 19 participating countries in the semi-final with 103 points. In the final, Finland performed in position 1 and placed twenty-first out of the 25 participating countries, scoring 57 points.

Background 

Prior to the 2011 contest, Finland had participated in the Eurovision Song Contest forty-four times since its first entry in 1961. Finland has won the contest once in 2006 with the song "Hard Rock Hallelujah" performed by Lordi. In the 2010 contest, "Työlki ellää" performed by Kuunkuiskaajat failed to qualify Finland to the final, placing eleventh in the semi-final.

The Finnish national broadcaster, Yleisradio (Yle), broadcasts the event within Finland and organises the selection process for the nation's entry. Yle confirmed their intentions to participate at the 2011 Eurovision Song Contest on 6 June 2010. Finland's entries for the Eurovision Song Contest have been selected through national final competitions that have varied in format over the years. Since 1961, a selection show that was often titled Euroviisukarsinta highlighted that the purpose of the program was to select a song for Eurovision. Along with their participation confirmation, the broadcaster also announced that the Finnish entry for the 2011 contest would be selected through the Euroviisut selection show.

Before Eurovision

Euroviisut 2011 
Euroviisut 2011 was the national final that selected Finland's entries for the Eurovision Song Contest 2011. The competition consisted of four shows that commenced with the first of three semi-finals on 14 January 2011 and concluded with a final on 12 February 2011. The four shows were hosted by Eurovision Song Contest 2007 host Jaana Pelkonen and YleX DJ Tom Nylund. All shows were broadcast on Yle TV2 and online at yle.fi. The final was also broadcast on Yle HD and via radio on Yle Radio Suomi with commentary by Sanna Kojo.

Format 
The format of the competition consisted of four shows: three semi-finals and a final. Five songs competed in each semi-final and the top three entries from each semi-final as well as a wildcard act selected by a jury from the remaining non-qualifying entries qualified to complete the ten-song lineup in the final. The results for the semi-finals and the final were determined exclusively by a public vote. Public voting included the options of telephone and SMS voting.

Competing entries 
Twelve artists, including the winner of the Finnish tango contest Tangomarkkinat in 2010, Marko Maunuksela, were directly invited by Yle to compete in the national final following consultation with record companies and presented during a press conference on 30 September 2010. Among the competing artists was former Finnish Eurovision entrant Sampsa Astala (lead singer of Stala ja So.) who represented Finland in 2006 as part of the band Lordi. A submission period was also opened by Yle which lasted between 6 June 2010 and 31 August 2010. At least one of the writers and the lead singer(s) had to hold Finnish citizenship or live in Finland permanently in order for the entry to qualify to compete. A panel of experts appointed by Yle selected fifteen entries for an online selection from the 277 received submissions. The competing entries were released on 30 September 2010 at yle.fi/euroviisut and the public was able to vote through SMS until 15 October 2010. The top three from the fifteen entries qualified to the national final and were announced during a televised programme on 16 October 2010.

Shows

Semi-finals
The three semi-final shows took place on 14, 21 and 28 January 2011 at the YLE Studios in Helsinki. The top three from the five competing entries in each semi-final qualified to the final based on the results from the public vote. "Dancing in the Dark" performed by Eveliina Määttä was awarded the jury wildcard and also qualified to the final.

Final 
The final took place on 12 February 2011 at the Holiday Club Caribia in Turku where the ten entries that qualified from the preceding three semi-finals competed. The winner was selected over two rounds of public televoting. In the first round, the top three from the ten competing entries qualified to the second round, the superfinal. In the superfinal, "Da Da Dam" performed by Paradise Oskar was selected as the winner. In addition to the performances of the competing entries, the interval act featured Linda Lampenius and Gentlemen.

Promotion 
Paradise Oskar specifically promoted "Da Da Dam" as the Finnish Eurovision entry on 14 April 2011 by performing during the Eurovision in Concert event which was held at the Club Air venue in Amsterdam, Netherlands and hosted by Cornald Maas, Esther Hart and Sascha Korf.

At Eurovision
According to Eurovision rules, all nations with the exceptions of the host country and the "Big Five" (France, Germany, Italy, Spain and the United Kingdom) are required to qualify from one of two semi-finals in order to compete for the final; the top ten countries from each semi-final progress to the final. The European Broadcasting Union (EBU) split up the competing countries into six different pots based on voting patterns from previous contests, with countries with favourable voting histories put into the same pot. On 17 January 2011, a special allocation draw was held which placed each country into one of the two semi-finals, as well as which half of the show they would perform in. Finland was placed into the first semi-final, to be held on 10 May 2011, and was scheduled to perform in the first half of the show. The running order for the semi-finals was decided through another draw on 15 March 2011 and Finland was set to perform in position 10, following the entry from Georgia and before the entry from Malta.

The two semi-finals and the final were televised in Finland on Yle TV2 and Yle HD with commentary in Finnish by Tarja Närhi and Asko Murtomäki. The three shows were also broadcast on Yle FST5 with commentary in Swedish by Eva Frantz and Johan Lindroos as well as via radio with Finnish commentary by Sanna Pirkkalainen and Jorma Hietamäki on Yle Radio Suomi. The Finnish spokesperson, who announced the Finnish votes during the final, was member of 2010 Finnish Eurovision entrant Kuunkuiskaajat, Susan Aho.

Semi-final 
Paradise Oskar took part in technical rehearsals on 1 and 5 May, followed by dress rehearsals on 9 and 10 May. This included the jury show on 9 May where the professional juries of each country watched and voted on the competing entries. The Finnish performance featured Paradise Oskar performing alone in a shirt and pants made of recyclable fabrics with the LED screens displaying an image of the Earth turning.

At the end of the show, Finland was announced as having finished in the top 10 and subsequently qualifying for the grand final. It was later revealed that Finland placed third in the semi-final, receiving a total of 103 points.

Final 
Shortly after the first semi-final, a winners' press conference was held for the ten qualifying countries. As part of this press conference, the qualifying artists took part in a draw to determine the running order for the final. This draw was done in the order the countries were announced during the semi-final. Finland was drawn to perform in position 1, before the entry from Bosnia and Herzegovina.

Paradise Oskar once again took part in dress rehearsals on 13 and 14 May before the final, including the jury final where the professional juries cast their final votes before the live show. Paradise Oskar performed a repeat of his semi-final performance during the final on 14 May. Finland placed twenty-first in the final, scoring 57 points.

Voting 
Voting during the three shows consisted of 50 percent public televoting and 50 percent from a jury deliberation. The jury consisted of five music industry professionals who were citizens of the country they represent. This jury was asked to judge each contestant based on: vocal capacity; the stage performance; the song's composition and originality; and the overall impression by the act. In addition, no member of a national jury could be related in any way to any of the competing acts in such a way that they cannot vote impartially and independently.

Following the release of the full split voting by the EBU after the conclusion of the competition, it was revealed that Finland had placed twenty-first with the public televote and seventeenth with the jury vote in the final. In the public vote, Finland scored 47 points, while with the jury vote, Finland scored 75 points. In the first semi-final, Finland placed third with the public televote and fifth with the jury vote. In the public vote, Finland scored 111 points, while with the jury vote, Finland scored 86 points.

Below is a breakdown of points awarded to Finland and awarded by Finland in the first semi-final and grand final of the contest. The nation awarded its 12 points to Hungary in the semi-final and the final of the contest.

Points awarded to Finland

Points awarded by Finland

References

External links 
 Euroviisut official website
 Euroviisut official website

2011
Countries in the Eurovision Song Contest 2011
Eurovision
Eurovision